Zelleria rorida is a moth in the family Yponomeutidae. It is endemic to New Zealand.

References

Yponomeutidae
Moths described in 1918
Moths of New Zealand
Endemic fauna of New Zealand
Taxa named by Alfred Philpott
Endemic moths of New Zealand